The 1949–50 season was Colchester United's eighth season in their history and their eighth and final season in the Southern League. Alongside competing in the Southern League, the club also participated in the FA Cup and Southern League Cup. The club finished as runner-up to Merthyr Tydfil in the league, but despite this Colchester were elected to the Football League at the end of the campaign with the expansion of the League from 88 to 92 clubs. The club won the Southern League Cup 6–4 on aggregate, while they exited the FA Cup at the fourth qualifying round stage following a 1–0 defeat by Wealdstone.

Season overview
Layer Road suffered storm damage ahead of the 1949–50 season, and owing to a shortage of steel, re-construction work was not complete as the season commenced. Manager Jimmy Allen strengthened his defence with the signing of Reg Stewart from Sheffield Wednesday and Bill Layton from Bradford Park Avenue, and by Christmas 1949, Colchester had lost just three of their 28 games played, one of which was the 1–0 FA Cup fourth qualifying round defeat to Wealdstone. The game was one of the first FA Cup ties to be broadcast on television, but on this occasion it was the U's who were on the receiving end of a cup shock.

Colchester had topped the table all season until a fixture-congested April, which saw them held to home draws by Torquay United Reserves and Gravesend & Northfleet, while suffering 5–0 and 6–1 defeats at main title rivals Merthyr Tydfil and Gillingham in the space of three days. Between those defeats, the U's had recovered some pride with a 3–0 Southern League Cup final first-leg win over Bath City. Competing in their fourth match in just five days, a weary Colchester side allowed Bath to lead the second-leg 4–1, meaning the tie would go to extra time. Vic Keeble and Dennis Hillman scored in the added 30-minutes, helping Colchester lift the trophy for the second time with their third final appearance in 3 years.

With Gillingham having defeated Merthyr Tydfil during midweek, all Colchester needed to do in their final fixture was to win at Barry Town to secure the title. However, they were held to a goalless draw and Merthyr Tydfil took the title on goal average. Despite this, Vic Keeble had been the club's top scorer with 46 goals, a record which remains intact. Supplementing this were Fred Cutting's 24 goal haul and Bob Curry's 22, while fellow forward Arthur Turner had spent the majority of the season out injured with cartilage damage.

On 3 June 1950, only Everton and West Bromwich Albion opposed the expansion of the Football League from 88 to 92 clubs by expanding the Third Division North and South, instead preferring another regional league. Of the applications for Third Division South election, Gillingham polled 44 votes, Colchester 28, Worcester City 11, Chelmsford City 8, Peterborough United 5 and Merthyr Tydfil and Yeovil Town just one vote each. Colchester United were elected to the Football League with a Supporters Club membership of over 16,000 and an average gate of over 8,500.

Players

Transfers

In

 Total spending:  ~ £2,800

Out

Match details

Southern League

League table

Matches

Southern League Cup

FA Cup

Squad statistics

Appearances and goals

|-
!colspan="14"|Players who appeared for Colchester who left during the season

|}

Goalscorers

Clean sheets
Number of games goalkeepers kept a clean sheet.

Player debuts
Players making their first-team Colchester United debut in a fully competitive match.

See also
List of Colchester United F.C. seasons

References

General

Specific

1949-50
English football clubs 1949–50 season